The Astroworld – Wish You Were Here Tour was the third concert tour by American recording artist Travis Scott in support of his third studio album Astroworld (2018). The tour began in Baltimore at Royal Farms Arena as the first leg on November 8, 2018 and concluded its second leg in Tulsa at BOK Center on March 26, 2019.

Background 
The tour was officially announced via Scott's Instagram on August 16, 2018. He announced, "Ive Been Ready To Get Back On Road For A Long Time!! Astroworld Tour Is Finally Here!!". In August 2018, prior to the start of the tour, Scott announced "this is leg one Europe and other cities coming soon".  At the start of the tour, Scott announced "more dates TBS". Scott also announced that Virgil Abloh, Sheck Wes, Trippie Redd, and Gunna would perform opening acts.

On December 7, 2018, it was announced that Redd would no longer support Scott as an opening act for the duration of the tour due to "production issues" and cut down set times.

On June 10, 2019, Travis announced a show at London's O2 Arena where he would officially end the tour.

Setup 
The initial idea of the Wish You Were Here Tour was to revive the childhood amusement park, Six Flags AstroWorld, so each stage was decorated in a fashion reminiscent of the theme park with features such as a small functioning ferris wheel and roller coaster. Instead of having one stage for the show, there were two stages, one on each end of the arena.

Critical reception

North America 
The show was reviewed positively by Charles Holmes in Rolling Stone, Julian Kimble in The Washington Post, and by Chris DeVille of Stereogum.

Setlist 
This set list is representative of the show in Baltimore, Maryland on November 8, 2018. It is not representative of all concerts for the duration of the tour.

"Stargazing"
"Lose" (instrumental) 
"Carousel"
"Quintana"
"Uptown"
"Way Back"
"Mamacita"
"Butterfly Effect"
"No Bystanders"
"Don't Play"
"3500" (shortened)
"Skyfall"
"Through the Late Night"
"Upper Echelon"
"Drugs You Should Try It"
"90210"
"Love Galore" (solo, originally by SZA)
"Skeletons"
"Astrothunder"
"R.I.P Screw"
"Houstonfornication"
"Stop Trying to Be God"
"NC-17"
"Zeze" (solo, originally by Kodak Black with Offset)
"Beibs in the Trap"
"Yosemite" (with Gunna)
"Piss On Your Grave" (instrumental)
"5% Tint"
"Can't Say" (with Don Toliver)
"Antidote"
"Goosebumps"
"Sicko Mode"

Tour dates 

Notes:
In the second US leg, "Quintana" and "Uptown" were replaced with "4 AM" and "First Off".
"3500" was taken out of the setlist in the second leg.
After the Toronto show in the first leg, "5% TINT" was also taken out of the setlist.
During the show in Raleigh, Sheck Wes was brought out to perform "Mo Bamba" after "NO BYSTANDERS". Trippie Redd was also brought out to perform "Dark Knight Dummo" after "Don't Play".
Don Toliver appeared at every show on the first US leg on the B stage to perform "CAN'T SAY" with Travis. He would then make occasional appearances at a few shows on the second US leg.
In a few select shows in the second leg, Travis would perform "Mile High" after Drugs You Should Try It.
Gunna appeared at every show in the first leg to perform his verse on "YOSEMITE". He didn't return on the second leg, due to him being on his own headlining tour at the time.
During the second show in Atlanta, Travis brought out surprise guests. 2 Chainz was brought out to perform "Whip" and "4 AM", which replaced "Don't Play". Rick Ross was brought out to perform "B.M.F." and "Pop That", which replaced "beibs in the trap". Young Thug was brought out to perform "pick up the phone" and "Digits" after "YOSEMITE". Future was brought out to perform "First Off" & "March Madness" after "goosebumps".
"pick up the phone" would be performed on the first leg only, with Travis bringing out Young Thug.
During the second show in Los Angeles, Travis brought out Young Thug and Quavo for "pick up the phone". After, Quavo would stay on stage for "Huncho Jack". NAV was also brought out for "YOSEMITE" (along with Gunna) and "beibs in the trap."
During the second show in Tampa, a snippet of "WAKE UP" was played before Travis performed "90210".
In the first US leg, during the second show in New York City, Travis brought out Kendrick Lamar for "goosebumps".
During the show in London, Scott brought out Ed Sheeran to perform "Antisocial" and Sheck Wes was brought out to perform "Mo Bamba" and "Live Sheck Wes".
During the shows in Miami and Inglewood, Scott brought out Drake for "SICKO MODE".

Cancelled shows

References 

2019 concert tours
2018 concert tours
Travis Scott concert tours
Concert tours of North America